Hohenlepte is a village and a former municipality in the district of Anhalt-Bitterfeld, in Saxony-Anhalt, Germany. Since 1 January 2010, it is part of the town Zerbst.

Hohenlepte in the region of Saxony-Anhalt with its 234 inhabitants is a town in Germany - some 71 mi (or 115 km) South-West of Berlin, the country's capital city.

Former municipalities in Saxony-Anhalt
Zerbst